This article aims to cover ideas of European unity before 1948.

Early history

The first instance of European unity came with the Roman Empire, and the resulting Pax Romana. A large portion of the European continent, stretching from Scotland to Greece, was conquered and united under Rome. However, with the Fall of the Western Roman Empire, and the reduced power of the East, post-Roman Europe fragmented into many different Germanic Kingdoms, which formed the basis for modern day European states.

"Europe" as a cultural sphere is first used during the Carolingian dynasty to encompass the Latin Church (as opposed to Eastern Orthodoxy).
Military unions of "European powers" in the medieval and early modern period were directed against the threat of Islamic expansion. Thus, in the wake of the Fall of Constantinople to the Turks in 1453, George of Podebrady, a Hussite king of Bohemia, proposed in 1464 a union of European, Christian nations against the Turks.

In 1693, William Penn looked at the devastation of war in Europe and wrote of a "European dyet, or parliament", to prevent further war, without further defining how such an institution would fit into the political reality of Europe at the time.

In 1713, Abbot Charles de Saint-Pierre proposed the creation of a European league of 18 sovereign states, with common treasury, no borders and an economic union.
After the American Revolutionary War the vision of a United States of Europe, similar to the United States of America, was shared by a few prominent Europeans, notably the Marquis de Lafayette and Tadeusz Kościuszko.

Some suggestion of a European union can be inferred from Immanuel Kant's 1795 proposal for an "eternal peace congress".

19th century

The concept of "Europe" referring to Western Europe or Germanic Europe arises in the 19th century, contrasting with the Russian Empire, as is evidenced in Russian philosopher Danilevsky's Russia and Europe.

In the 1800s, a customs union under Napoleon Bonaparte's Continental system was promulgated in November 1806 as an embargo of British goods in the interests of the French hegemony. Felix Markham notes how during a conversation on St. Helena, Napoleon remarked, "Europe thus divided into nationalities freely formed and free internally, peace between States would have become easier: the United States of Europe would become a possibility."

The French socialists Saint-Simon and Augustin Thierry would in 1814 write the essay De la réorganisation de la société européenne, already conjuring up some form of parliamentary European federation.

In the conservative reaction after Napoleon's defeat in 1815, the German Confederation was established as a loose association of thirty-eight sovereign German states formed by the Congress of Vienna. Napoleon had swept away the Holy Roman Empire and simplified the map of Germany. In 1834, the Zollverein ("customs union") was formed among the states of the Confederation, to create better trade flow and reduce internal competition. In spite of the allusion by Fritz Fischer in Germany's Aims in the First World War that an extension of this customs union may have become the model for a unified Europe, the ensuing North German Confederation established in 1866 drifted away from the inclusive multinational character of the preceding German Confederation and the early Kingdom of Prussia, taking instead the direction of staunch German nationalism and brutal subjugation of other nations living within the borders of the succeeding German Empire. The then current and influential German ideas of geopolitics and a Mitteleuropa later became increasingly degenerated due to their underlying principle of German national hegemony, a process culminating in the abhorrent vision laid out by the national socialists of European unity understood as universal servitude of the European nations to the Germans (see below), thus contradicting directly the current intellectual framework for European Union. 

United States of Europe was also the name of the concept presented by Wojciech Jastrzębowski in About eternal peace between the nations, published 31 May 1831. The project consisted of 77 articles. The envisioned United States of Europe was to be an international organisation rather than a superstate.

Italian writer and politician Giuseppe Mazzini called for the creation of a federation of European republics in 1843. This set the stage for perhaps the best known early proposal for peaceful unification, through cooperation and equality of membership, made by the pacifist Victor Hugo in 1847. Hugo used the term United States of Europe during a speech at the International Peace Congress, organised by Mazzini, held in Paris in 1849. Hugo favoured the creation of "a supreme, sovereign senate, which will be to Europe what parliament is to England" and said "A day will come when all nations on our continent will form a European brotherhood ... A day will come when we shall see ... the United States of America and the United States of Europe face to face, reaching out for each other across the seas." However, he was laughed out of the hall, yet returned to his idea again in 1851. Victor Hugo planted an oaktree in the grounds of his residence on the Island of Guernsey he was noted in saying that when this tree matured the United States of Europe would have come into being. This tree to this day is still growing in the gardens of Maison de Hauteville, St. Peter Port, Guernsey, Victor Hugo's residence during his exile from France.

The Italian philosopher Carlo Cattaneo wrote "The ocean is rough and whirling, and the currents go to two possible endings: the autocrat, or the United States of Europe". In 1867 Giuseppe Garibaldi, and John Stuart Mill joined Victor Hugo at the first congress of the League of Peace and Freedom in Geneva. Here the anarchist Mikhail Bakunin stated "That in order to achieve the triumph of liberty, justice and peace in the international relations of Europe, and to render civil war impossible among the various peoples which make up the European family, only a single course lies open: to constitute the United States of Europe". The French National Assembly, also called for a United States of Europe on 1 March 1871.

As part of 19th c. concerns about an ailing Europe and the threat posed by the Mahdi, the Polish writer, Theodore de Korwin Szymanowski's original contribution was to focus not on nationalism, sovereignty and federation, but foremost on economics, statistics, monetary policy and parliamentary reform. His L'Avenir économique, politique et social en Europe – The Future of Europe in Economic, Political and Social Terms – published in Paris in 1885 was in effect, a blueprint for a unified Europe with a customs union, a central statistical office, a central bank and a single currency.

Between the World Wars

Following the catastrophe of the First World War, thinkers and visionaries from a range of political traditions again began to float the idea of a politically unified Europe. In the early 1920s a range of internationals were founded (or re-founded) to help like-minded political parties to coordinate their activities. These ranged from the Comintern (1919), to the Labour and Socialist International (1921) to the Radical and Democratic Entente of centre-left progressive parties (1924), to the Green International of farmers' parties (1923), to the centre-right International Secretariat of Democratic Parties Inspired by Christianity (1925). While the remit of these internationals was global, the predominance of political parties from Europe meant that they facilitated interaction between the adherents of a given ideology, across European borders. Within each political tradition, voices emerged advocating not merely the cooperation of various national parties, but the pursuit of political institutions at the European level.

With a conservative vision of Europe, the Austrian Count Richard von Coudenhove-Kalergi founded the Pan-Europa movement in 1923, hosting the First Paneuropean Congress in Vienna in 1926, and which contained 8000 members by the time of the 1929 Wall Street Crash. The aim was for a specifically Christian, and by implication Catholic, Europe. The British civil servant and future Conservative minister Arthur Salter published a book advocating The United States of Europe in 1933.

In contrast the Soviet commissar (minister) Leon Trotsky raised the slogan "For a Soviet United States of Europe" in 1923, advocating a Europe united along communist principles.

Among liberal-democratic parties, the French centre-left undertook several initiatives to group like-minded parties from the European states. In 1927, the French politician Emil Borel, a leader of the centre-left Radical Party and the founder of the Radical International, set up a French Committee for European Cooperation, and a further twenty countries set up equivalent committees. However, it remained an elite venture: the largest committee, the French one, possessed fewer than six-hundred members, two-thirds of whom were parliamentarians. Two centre-left French prime ministers went further.  In 1929 Aristide Briand gave a speech in the presence of the League of Nations Assembly in which he proposed the idea of a federation of European nations based on solidarity and in the pursuit of economic prosperity and political and social co-operation. In 1930, at the League's request, Briand presented a Memorandum on the organisation of a system of European Federal Union.  The next year the future French prime minister Édouard Herriot published his book The United States of Europe. Indeed, a template for such a system already existed, in the form of the 1921 Belgian and Luxembourgish customs and monetary union.

Support for the proposals by the French centre-left came from a range of prestigious figures. Many eminent economists, aware that the economic race-to-the-bottom between states was creating ever greater instability, supported the view: these included John Maynard Keynes. The French political scientist and economist Bertrand Jouvenel remembered a widespread mood after 1924 calling for a "harmonisation of national interests along the lines of European union, for the purpose of common prosperity". The Spanish philosopher and politician, Ortega y Gasset, expressed a position shared by many within Republican Spain: "European unity is no fantasy, but reality itself; and the fantasy is precisely the opposite: the belief that France, Germany, Italy or Spain are substantive & independent realities.” Eleftherios Venizelos, Prime Minister of Greece, outlined his government's support in a 1929 speech by saying that "the United States of Europe will represent, even without Russia, a power strong enough to advance, up to a satisfactory point, the prosperity of the other continents as well".

Between the two world wars, the Polish statesman Józef Piłsudski envisaged the idea of a European federation that he called Międzymorze ("Intersea" or "Between-seas"), known in English as Intermarum, which was a Polish-oriented version of Mitteleuropa, though devised according to the principle of cooperation rather than subjugation.

The Great Depression, the rise of fascism and communism and subsequently World War II prevented the inter war movements from gaining further support: between 1933 and 1936 most of Europe's remaining democracies became dictatorships, and even Ortega's Spain and Venizelos's Greece had both been plunged into civil war. But although the supporters of European unity, whether social-democratic, liberal or Christian-democratic, were out of power during the 1930s and unable to put their ideas into practice, many would find themselves in power in the 1940s and 1950s, and better-placed to put into effect their earlier remedies against economic and political crisis.

World War II
In Britain the group known as Federal Union was launched in November 1938, and began advocating a Federal Union of Europe as a post-war aim. Its papers and arguments became well known among resistants to fascism across Europe and contributed to their thinking of how to rebuild Europe after the war.

Among those who were early advocates of a union of European nations was Hungarian Prime Minister Pál Teleki. Hungary had lost over two-thirds of its territory at the end of World War I in the 1920 Treaty of Trianon. In early 1941 during the Second World War, he was striving to keep Hungary autonomous. Internally, he tried to satisfy national pride which demanded a restoration of the lost territories, which Germany had supported in the First Vienna Award of 1938 and the Second Vienna Award of 1940. Externally, he was striving to preserve his country's military and economic independence in the face of Germany's coercive pressure to join in their invasion of Yugoslavia. In the book, Transylvania. The Land Beyond the Forest Louis C. Cornish described how Teleki, under constant surveillance by the German Gestapo during 1941, sent a secret communication to contacts in America.

Journalist Dorothy Thompson in 1941 supported the statement of others. "I took from Count Teleki's office a monograph which he had written upon the structure of European nations. A distinguished geographer, he was developing a plan for regional federation, based upon geographical and economic realities." Teleki received no response from the Americans to his ideas and when German troops moved through Hungary on 2–3 April 1941 during the invasion of Yugoslavia, he committed suicide.

In 1943, the German ministers Joachim von Ribbentrop and Cecil von Renthe-Fink eventually proposed the creation of a "European confederacy" as part of a New Order on the continent. The proposal, which attracted little support from the Nazi leadership, would have had a single currency, a central bank in Berlin, a regional principle, a labour policy and economic and trading agreements but left all states clearly subordinated to Nazi Germany. The countries proposed for inclusion were Germany, Italy, France, Denmark, Norway, Finland, Slovakia, Hungary, Bulgaria, Romania, Croatia, Serbia, Sweden, Greece and Spain. Such a German-led Europe, it was hoped, would serve as a strong alternative to the Communist Soviet Union and the United States. It is worth noting that Austria, the Benelux countries, the Czech Republic, Poland, Slovenia and Switzerland, the Baltic states, Russia, Belarus and Ukraine were omitted from the list of proposed countries, as their future integration into the German Reich had already been decided. The later Foreign Minister Arthur Seyss-Inquart said: "The new Europe of solidarity and co-operation among all its people will find rapidly increasing prosperity once national economic boundaries are removed", while the Vichy French Minister Jacques Benoist-Méchin said that France had to "abandon nationalism and take place in the European community with honour."  These pan-European illusions from the early 1940s were never realised because of Germany's defeat. Neither Hitler, nor many of his leading hierarchs such as Goebbels, had the slightest intention of compromising absolute German hegemony through the creation of a European confederation. Although this fact has been used to insinuate the charge of fascism in the EU, the idea is much older than the Nazis, foreseen by John Maynard Keynes, and later Winston Churchill and various anti-Nazi resistance movements.

One of the most influential figures in this process was Altiero Spinelli, author of the Ventotene Manifesto entitled "Towards a Free and United Europe"  and smuggled out of their internment camp – the island of Ventotene – as early as 1941, well before the outcome of the war was safely predictable, and widely circulated in the resistance movements. Spinelli, Ursula Hirschmann and Colorni, Rossi and some 20 other established, as soon as they were able to leave their internment camp, the Movimento Federalista Europeo (MFE). The founding meeting, secretly held in Milan on the 27/28 August 1943, adopted a "political thesis" which, inter alia, stated: "if a post war order is established in which each State retains its complete national sovereignty, the basis for a Third World War would still exist even after the Nazi attempt to establish the domination of the German race in Europe has been frustrated". In 1943, Jean Monnet a member of the National Liberation Committee of the Free French government in exile in Algiers, and regarded by many as the future architect of European unity, is recorded as declaring to the committee: "There will be no peace in Europe, if the states are reconstituted on the basis of national sovereignty ... The countries of Europe are too small to guarantee their peoples the necessary prosperity and social development. The European states must constitute themselves into a federation ...". Winston Churchill called in 1943 for a post-war "Council of Europe". 

Towards the end of World War II, the Three Allied Powers discussed during the Tehran Conference and the ensuing 1943 Moscow Conference the plans to establish joint institutions. This led to a decision at the Yalta Conference in 1944 to include Free France as the Fourth Allied Power and to form a European Advisory Commission, later replaced by the Council of Foreign Ministers and the Allied Control Council, following the German surrender and the Potsdam Agreement in 1945.

Postwar developments (1945-1948)

After the war on 19 September 1946 Chruchill went further as a civilian, after leaving his office, at the University of Zürich, calling for a United States of Europe.  Coincidentally parallel to his speech the Hertenstein Congress in the Lucerne Canton was being held, resulting in the Union of European Federalists. Richard von Coudenhove-Kalergi, who successfully established during the interwar period the oldest organization for European integration, the Paneuropean Union, founded in June 1947 the European Parliamentary Union (EPU). To ensure Germany could never threaten the peace again, its heavy industry was partly dismantled (See: Allied plans for German industry after World War II) and its main coal-producing regions were either awarded to neighbouring countries (Silesia), managed as separate directly by an occupying power (Saarland) or put under international control (Ruhr area).

The growing rift among the Four Powers became evident as a result of the rigged 1947 Polish legislative election which constituted an open breach of the Yalta Agreement, followed by the announcement of the Truman Doctrine on 12 March 1947. On 4 March 1947 France and the United Kingdom signed the Treaty of Dunkirk for mutual assistance in the event of future military aggression in the aftermath of World War II against any of the pair. The rationale for the treaty was the threat of a potential future military attack, specifically a Soviet one in practice, though publicised under the disguise of a German one, according to the official statements. Immediately following the February 1948 coup d'état by the Communist Party of Czechoslovakia, the London Six-Power Conference was held, resulting in the Soviet boycott of the Allied Control Council and its incapacitation, an event marking the beginning of the Cold War. The remainder of the year 1948 marked the beginning of the institutionalised modern European integration.

See also 
 Continental System
 European integration
 Federal Europe
 History of the European Union
 Pan-European identity
 Universal Monarchy

References

Further reading
 Dedman, Martin. The origins and development of the European Union 1945-1995: a history of European integration (Routledge, 2006).
 De Vries, Catherine E. "Don't Mention the War! Second World War Remembrance and Support for European Cooperation." JCMS: Journal of Common Market Studies (2019).
 Dinan, Desmond. Europe recast: a history of European Union (2nd ed. Palgrave Macmillan), 2004 excerpt. 
 Heuser, Beatrice. Brexit in History: Sovereignty or a European Union?  (2019) excerpt also see  online review
 Kaiser, Wolfram, and Antonio Varsori, eds. European Union history: themes and debates (Springer, 2010).
 Patel, Kiran Klaus, and Wolfram Kaiser. "Continuity and change in European cooperation during the twentieth century." Contemporary European History 27.2 (2018): 165–182. online 

1944